Aftab may refer to:

Aftab, surname and given name
Includes lists of people with this name

IRIB AFTAB, a television channel in Iran
A former weekly publication, closed in June 2003 in Afghanistan
Aftab, Iran, a village in Tehran Province, Iran
Aftab District, an administrative subdivision of Tehran Province, Iran
Aftab Rural District, an administrative subdivision of Tehran Province, Iran
Order of Aftab, Persian decoration